"Ghost Stories" is the ninth episode of the horror black comedy series Scream Queens. It first aired on November 17, 2015 on Fox. The episode was directed by Michael Uppendahl and written by Ryan Murphy. The episode focuses on Denise (Niecy Nash)'s attempt to calm The Chanels down by telling them ghost stories and urban legends, which start to become true. The episode also features the return of special guest star Nick Jonas as Boone Clemens, whose activities while being absent are revealed in this episode.

The episode was viewed by 2.37 million viewers during its premiere and received generally positive reviews from critics.

Plot

As Boone Clemens (Nick Jonas) continues his disguise as Joaquin Phoenix as he calls an unknown person over the phone, his fake beard falls off, just as he runs into Chanel #3 (Billie Lourd). He realizes that he's been caught and as soon as he starts to confess, she mistakes him for a ghost. Confused, Boone decides to play along with it and tells her he is the ghost, scaring her away. When she goes back to Kappa House and informs the other Chanels of her encounter with Boone, Denise (Niecy Nash) tells them a couple of ghost stories, stating that they'll be so scared of the cautionary tales that their minds off of the Red Devil and Boone's ghost. The stories only make the Chanels more frightened, with a lore about killers that drag people in the toilet while they're using it, or killers that murder you based on your decision of toilet paper. Later, Boone pays a visit to Chad (Glen Powell), who also thinks he's a ghost. He asks Chad if he can borrow a 'date shirt' of his, saying that the only way for him to be 'among the living' would be to have sex with Zayday (Keke Palmer), much to Chad's confusion at first, knowing Boone is gay, but later complies.

Denise is then seen about to use the bathroom, sitting down only to find a choice of blue and red toilet paper. Suddenly, the Red Devil pounces from above, attempting to give her a swirly. She barely escapes, rushing over to the rest of the girls, saying that she needs a ghost story to calm her down. Hester (Lea Michele) begins a story about a meathook killer that runs away and is never found. The legend is that a girl driving a car and got honked by a truck behind her who tried to warn her about a meathook killer in the back seat of her car. Nobody seems to have enjoyed the tale. Denise, feeling much more refreshed, unlocks the doors. Later, Hester told everyone that she is pregnant with Chad's baby. An outraged Chanel goes to confront her boyfriend, who doesn't deny it. She threatens to kill him.

Chanel #5 (Abigail Breslin) has had enough of being hunted down by the Red Devil, stating that she's leaving and driving home. Sitting in her car, on the radio there is an announcement that warns all passersby of Wallace University to be on the lookout for serial killer, Boone Clemens. The radio then reverts to a calming song, but she is then suddenly interrupted by the honking of a truck driver behind her. She begins to speed up, as we see the Red Devil in her car being honked by the truck driver every time he pops up. She then pulls up in a gas station alongside the truck driver, kicking him in the groin. The truck driver says he was only trying to protect her. As he's explaining this to her, the Red Devil sneaks up behind him and fatally stabs him with a machete. Libby escapes and drives back to campus.

Zayday and Earl Grey (Lucien Laviscount) are passionately kissing on Zayday's bed until Earl stops them, saying that he wants everything to be perfect, running quickly to get his 'equipment', implying they want to have sex. Boone climbs through her bedroom window, trying to seduce Zayday, still pretending to be his ghost. Zayday does not buy into it at all and realizes Boone is one of the Red Devil. Grace walks in and realizes everything that's going on. They try to drag him away so they can turn him in, but he shoves them away and falls out the window. But when they look out the window, he has disappeared. Before he can make it back to Zayday's room, Earl is fatally stabbed by the Red Devil. Before Earl dies, the Red Devil removes his mask, revealing him as Boone.

Arriving back at the Kappa House, Libby returns with news that the Red Devil attacked her, but Chanel (Emma Roberts) says that this was just mirroring the tale that Hester had told them before about the meathook killer. Libby still continually rants about how nobody is consoling her, as Zayday still grieves the death of her boyfriend Earl. Boone is at Gigi's (Nasim Pedrad) house, telling her that he'd had enough following her instructions. He did everything; including pretending to be gay, to follow her schemes. He is intent on murdering her with the help of the other Red Devil, only to be turned on by the other Red Devil, who fatally stabs him in the chest. Back at the Kappa House, The Chanels try to prove that Hester isn't actually pregnant, which succeeds. But Hester says that she will still have Chad get her pregnant. Angered, Chanel pushes Hester down the stairs, presumably breaking her neck and the Chanels stare at her lifeless body while Chanel announces that they've made their "own ghost story".

Production
Nick Jonas and Niecy Nash return as special guest stars, playing Boone Clemens, the former member of the Dickie Dollar Scholars who faked his death and the ally of the Red Devil, and Denise Hemphill, the kick-butt but odd security guard.

Reception

Ratings
Ghost Stories was watched live by 2.37 million U.S. viewers and got a 0.9 rating/3 share in the adult 18-49 demographic.

Critical reception
Ghost Stories receive generally positive review from critics. Terri Schwartz from IGN gave the episode 8.0 out of 10, stated "Though Scream Queens still feels like it can't move the plot forward quickly without giving away the killer, "Ghost Stories" provided some fun new details without being completely focused on the murder mystery." LaToya Ferguson from The A.V. club gave the episode B, noting "it’s easy to assume that Ryan Murphy (who penned this episode) doesn’t know what lampshading is; this episode’s so meta that if he did know, Kappa Kappa Tau would likely have gotten a home décor delivery by the beginning of Act Three."

References

2015 American television episodes
Scream Queens (2015 TV series) episodes
Television episodes directed by Michael Uppendahl
Television episodes written by Ryan Murphy (writer)